†Helenoconcha sexdentata was a species of small air-breathing land snails, terrestrial pulmonate gastropod mollusks in the family Charopidae.

This species was endemic to Saint Helena. It is now extinct.

References

Helenoconcha
Extinct gastropods
Taxonomy articles created by Polbot